Frédéric Petit (3 June 1836 – 20 April 1895) was a French politician. He was born in the Somme commune of Bussy-lès-Daours.  He served as the mayor of the city of Amiens from 1880 to 1881 and again from 1884 to 1885.  On 31 January 1886, during the French Third Republic, he was elected the Senator of Somme.  He was reelected on 4 January 1891 but did not complete his full term due to his death in 1895.

References
  Google translation

1836 births
1895 deaths
People from Somme (department)
French republicans
French Senators of the Third Republic
Senators of Somme (department)
French Freemasons
19th-century French politicians